The following lists events that happened during 2000 in Argentina.

Incumbents
President: Fernando de la Rúa 
Vice President: Carlos Álvarez (until October 6), vacant thereafter

Governors
Governor of Buenos Aires Province: Carlos Ruckauf 
Governor of Catamarca Province: Oscar Castillo 
Governor of Chaco Province: Ángel Rozas 
Governor of Chubut Province: José Luis Lizurume 
Governor of Córdoba: José Manuel De la Sota 
Governor of Corrientes Province: 
 until 20 March: Ramón Mestre
 20 March-10 December: Oscar Aguad
 starting 10 December: Ricardo Colombi 
Governor of Entre Ríos Province: Sergio Montiel 
Governor of Formosa Province: Gildo Insfrán
Governor of Jujuy Province: Eduardo Fellner 
Governor of La Pampa Province: Rubén Marín 
Governor of La Rioja Province: Ángel Maza 
Governor of Mendoza Province: Roberto Iglesias 
Governor of Misiones Province: Carlos Rovira
Governor of Neuquén Province: Jorge Sobisch 
Governor of Río Negro Province: Pablo Verani 
Governor of Salta Province: Juan Carlos Romero 
Governor of San Juan Province: Alfredo Avelín 
Governor of San Luis Province: Adolfo Rodríguez Saá 
Governor of Santa Cruz Province: Néstor Kirchner 
Governor of Santa Fe Province: Carlos Reutemann 
Governor of Santiago del Estero: Carlos Juárez 
Governor of Tierra del Fuego: Carlos Manfredotti 
Governor of Tucumán: Julio Miranda

Vice Governors
Vice Governor of Buenos Aires Province: Felipe Solá 
Vice Governor of Catamarca Province: Hernán Colombo 
Vice Governor of Chaco Province: Roy Nikisch 
Vice Governor of Corrientes Province: vacant 
Vice Governor of Entre Rios Province: Edelmiro Tomás Pauletti 
Vice Governor of Formosa Province: Floro Bogado 
Vice Governor of Jujuy Province: Rubén Daza 
Vice Governor of La Pampa Province: Heriberto Mediza 
Vice Governor of La Rioja Province: Luis Beder Herrera 
Vice Governor of Misiones Province: Mercedes Margarita Oviedo
Vice Governor of Nenquen Province: Jorge Sapag 
Vice Governor of Rio Negro Province: Bautista Mendioroz 
Vice Governor of Salta Province: Walter Wayar 
Vice Governor of San Juan Province: Marcelo Lima
Vice Governor of San Luis Province: María Alicia Lemme 
Vice Governor of Santa Cruz: vacant
Vice Governor of Santa Fe Province: Marcelo Muniagurria 
Vice Governor of Santiago del Estero: vacant 
Vice Governor of Tierra del Fuego: Daniel Gallo

Events

January
7 January: 35 years after the last expedition, an Argentine group reaches the South Pole.

February
3 February: Murderers of José Luis Cabezas get life imprisonment sentence .

March
8 March: Heavy rains cause floods in Tucumán Province, which then expand to Santiago del Estero  and Córdoba  .
30 March: The government announces salary cuts of 12 to 15% for state employees, following pressures of the IMF.

April

May
7 May: Aníbal Ibarra is elected Head of Government (mayor) of the Autonomous City of  Buenos Aires .

June
7 June: Argentine state-owned company INVAP wins a bid to construct a nuclear reactor for Australia .
28 June: The World Bank grants Argentina a $3,000 million loan to fight poverty .

July

August

September

October

November

December

Deaths
 February 12: Juan Carlos Thorry (b. 1908), actor. .
 August 24: Rodrigo Bueno (b. 1973), singer and cuartetazo idol.
 July 29: René Favaloro (b. 1923), cardiologist, creator of the coronary artery bypass surgery technique
 October 28: Carlos Guastavino (b. 1912), composer
 November 10: Aníbal Verón, bus driver and activist, piquetero icon
 December 12: Libertad Lamarque (b. 1908), actress

Sports
See worldwide 2000 in sports
June 21: Boca Juniors wins the Copa Libertadores 2000 after beating Palmeiras in São Paulo on penalties.
June 26: Huracán wins the 1999/00 second division to return to first division

See also
List of Argentine films of 2000

 
Argentina
Years of the 20th century in Argentina
Argentina
2000s in Argentina